Langi Gleeson is an Australian rugby union player who plays for the  in Super Rugby and Australia national team. His playing position is flanker or number 8. He was named in the Waratahs squad for the 2022 Super Rugby Pacific season as a wider training squad player.

Test Career
On the 30th of October 2022, Gleeson made his test debut when he took was substituted for Rob Valetini in the 74th minute against Scotland which the Wallabies won, 16 to 15. On the 27th of November, 2022, Gleeson made his debut test start for Australia in which they won 39 to 34 against Wales.

Reference list

External links
 

Australian rugby union players
Living people
Rugby union flankers
Rugby union number eights
New South Wales Waratahs players
Year of birth missing (living people)
Australia international rugby union players